Shawn Patrick Stockman (born September 26, 1972) is an American singer, songwriter and record producer. He is best known as a member of the vocal group Boyz II Men. 

In addition to Boyz II Men, Stockman was a member of the group Black Men United. He was also a judge on the NBC television show The Sing-Off for five seasons (2009-2014).

Early life and education 
Stockman, a native of Southwest Philadelphia, started singing with the Philadelphia Boys Choir & Chorale at the age of 8. He attended CAPA (Creative and Performing Arts High School) in South Philadelphia, where he met the other members of Boyz II Men, originally calling themselves Unique Attraction.

Music career 
Stockman recorded a solo album as a side project during the late 1990s, but the LP was never released.

Stockman appeared in the group Black Men United with his group Boyz II Men, while recording their II album for the hit single "U Will Know" which appeared on the Jason's Lyric soundtrack (1994). He also wrote and sang the song "Visions of a Sunset" for the Mr. Holland's Opus soundtrack (1996). 

Stockman wrote the songs "Forever", "Hot Thing" and "Let It Go" (which was played during the Showtime film Seventeen Again). He also recorded a cover version of Beyoncé's hit song "If I Were a Boy", and contributed vocals on the title track of the Foo Fighters album Concrete and Gold (2017).

Stockman started his own record label called Soul Chemistry Projects. He released solo albums Shawn in 2018, and Forward in April 2020.

Personal life 
Stockman is married to Sharonda Jones. He is the cousin of Atlanta-based neo soul singer Anthony David. 

Stockman is an honorary member of Phi Beta Sigma (2021).

References

External links 
 
 
 [ Shawn Stockman] at Allmusic

1972 births
American contemporary R&B singers
American soul musicians
Boyz II Men members
American tenors
Living people
Musicians from Philadelphia
Singers from Pennsylvania
Songwriters from Pennsylvania
Philadelphia High School for the Creative and Performing Arts alumni
African-American male songwriters
20th-century African-American male singers
21st-century African-American male singers
Judges in American reality television series